"Kiss Me Deadly" is a 1988 song by Lita Ford, appearing on the album Lita released in the same year. It is regarded as one of Ford's signature songs, and is the second highest-charting single of her solo career, after "Close My Eyes Forever" from the same album.

Music video
The song's video was placed on New York Times list of the 15 Essential Hair-Metal Videos.

Chart performance

Popular culture
The song received renewed interest thirty years after its release when it was featured in the 2019 superhero film Captain Marvel.

References 

Songs about kissing
1988 singles
1988 songs
Lita Ford songs
RCA Records singles
Song recordings produced by Mike Chapman